The 2022–23 Regionalliga is the 15th season of the Regionalliga, the eleventh under the new format, as the fourth tier of the German football league system.

Format
According to the promotion rules decided upon in 2019, the Regionalliga Südwest and West received a direct promotion spot. Based on a rotation principle, the Regionalliga Nord also received the third direct promotion spot this season, while the Regionalliga Nordost and Bayern champions will play a promotion play-off.

Regionalliga Nord
19 teams from the states of Bremen, Hamburg, Lower Saxony and Schleswig-Holstein compete in the eleventh season of the reformed Regionalliga Nord. TSV Havelse was relegated from the 2021–22 3. Liga. Blau-Weiß Lohne and Kickers Emden were promoted from the 2021–22 Oberliga Niedersachsen and Bremer SV was promoted from the 2021–22 Bremen-Liga.

The league was not split this season, returning to the format from the 2019–20 season.

Top scorers

Regionalliga Nordost
18 teams from the states of Berlin, Brandenburg, Mecklenburg-Vorpommern, Saxony, Saxony-Anhalt and Thuringia compete in the eleventh season of the reformed Regionalliga Nordost. Viktoria Berlin was relegated from the 2021–22 3. Liga. Greifswalder FC was promoted from the 2021–22 NOFV-Oberliga Nord and Rot-Weiß Erfurt was promoted from the 2021–22 NOFV-Oberliga Süd.

Top scorers

Regionalliga West
18 teams from North Rhine-Westphalia compete in the eleventh season of the reformed Regionalliga West. 1. FC Düren was promoted from the 2021–22 Mittelrheinliga, 1. FC Bocholt was promoted from the 2021–22 Oberliga Niederrhein and 1. FC Kaan-Marienborn and SG Wattenscheid were promoted from the 2021–22 Oberliga Westfalen.

Prior to the season, the Westphalian Football and Athletics Association permanently abolished the DFB-Pokal play-off between the champions of the Oberliga Westfalen and the best-placed Westphalian team from the Regionalliga West. From this season onwards, the DFB-Pokal spot will alternate between the two aforementioned teams, starting with the Regionalliga West team.

Top scorers

Regionalliga Südwest
18 teams from Baden-Württemberg, Hesse, Rhineland-Palatinate and Saarland compete in the eleventh season of the Regionalliga Südwest. Wormatia Worms and Eintracht Trier were promoted from the 2021–22 Oberliga Rheinland-Pfalz/Saar, SGV Freiberg was promoted from the 2021–22 Oberliga Baden-Württemberg and Barockstadt Fulda-Lehnerz was promoted from the 2021–22 Hessenliga.

Top scorers

Regionalliga Bayern
20 teams from Bavaria competed in the tenth season of the Regionalliga Bayern. Würzburger Kickers and Türkgücü München were relegated from the 2021–22 3. Liga. DJK Vilzing and SpVgg Ansbach were promoted from the 2021–22 Bayernliga Nord and SpVgg Hankofen-Hailing was promoted from the 2021–22 Bayernliga Süd.

Top scorers

Relegation play-offs

|}

Promotion play-offs

|}

All times Central European Summer Time (UTC+2)

References

External links
 Regionalliga   DFB.de
 Regionalliga Nord  nordfv.de
 Regionalliga West  wdfv.de
 Regionalliga Bayern  bfv.de

2022-23
4
Germany
Germany, 4